National Institute of Pharmaceutical Education and Research, Ahmedabad (NIPER Ahmedabad) is an Indian public Pharmacy research university, and a part of the seven schools, under India's Ministry of Chemicals and Fertilizers. The institute offers Masters and Doctoral degrees in pharmaceutical sciences. As an Institute of National Importance it plays an important role in the Human Resource Development for the ever growing Indian Pharmaceutical industry, which has been in the forefront of India’s science-based industries with wide ranging capabilities in this important field of drug manufacture.

Academics
The institute offers a 2 year PG degree course; MS (Pharm.) in 7 disciplines ( Biotechnology, Medicinal Chemistry, Medical Devices, Pharmacology & Toxicology, Natural Products, Pharmaceutical Analysis & Pharmaceutics).

Ranking

National Institute of Pharmaceutical Education and Research, Ahmedabad was ranked 10th in India by the National Institutional Ranking Framework (NIRF) pharmacy ranking in 2022. NIPER was ranked on 8th position in 2021.

Notable Personality
Rakesh Kumar Tekade, Associate Professor, has been recently listed among Top 2% Scientists in the field of Pharmacy and Pharmacology in the world list published by Stanford University, USA. Notably, he was the youngest Indian in the list. Prof. Tekade is an academic-researcher with more than 15 years of teaching and research experience. His research group investigates the design, development, and characterization of targeted nanotechnology-based products for the site-specific delivery of therapeutic drugs, siRNA, miRNA, etc., for cancer treatment, diabetes, arthritis, and neurological disorders. He coauthored > 300 peer-reviewed publications (>8500 citations; H–index of 50) and several patent applications to his credit. Dr. Tekade is an Editor in Chief of a famous Book Series entitled "Advances in Pharmaceutical Product Development and Research Series”. https://www.elsevier.com/catalog/pharma/pharmaceutical-science/drug-delivery/advances-in-pharmaceutical-product-development-and-research.

References

Universities and colleges in Ahmedabad
National Institute of Pharmaceutical Education and Research
Research institutes in Ahmedabad
Research institutes in Gujarat
2007 establishments in Gujarat
Educational institutions established in 2007